Bor is a rural locality (a village) in Beketovskoye Rural Settlement, Vozhegodsky District, Vologda Oblast, Russia. The population was 16 as of 2002.

Geography 
Bor is located 54 km west of Vozhega (the district's administrative centre) by road. Beketovskaya is the nearest rural locality.

References 

Rural localities in Vozhegodsky District